Diego Fernández (c. 1520–c. 1581) was a Spanish adventurer and historian.

Diego Fernández may also refer to:
Diego Fernández of Oviedo (fl. 1020–c. 1046), Count of Asturias and father of Jimena Díaz, the wife of Rodrigo Díaz de Vivar, el Cid
Diego Fernández de Ovando, Spanish military and nobleman, knight of the Order of Alcántara in 1338
Diego Fernández de la Cueva, 1st Viscount of Huelma (died 1473), Spanish nobleman
Diego Fernández de Córdoba y Arellano, 1st Marquis of Comares (1463–1518), Governor of Oran and Mazalquivir and Viceroy of Navarre,
Diego Fernández de Proaño, Spanish explorer and conquistador
Diego Fernández de Cáceres y Ovando (died 1487), Spanish military and nobleman
Diego Fernández de Córdoba, 1st Marquess of Guadalcázar (1578–1630), Viceroy of Mexico, 1612–1621, and Viceroy of Peru, 1622–1629
Diego Fernández (harpsichord maker) (1703–1775), harpsichord maker of the Spanish court 
Diego Fernández de Cevallos (born 1941), Mexican politician affiliated to the conservative National Action Party

See also
Diogo Fernandes
Diogo Fernandes (count)